Kim Kuk-thae (27 August 1924 – 13 December 2013) was an elder apparatchik of the Workers' Party of Korea, the ruling party in North Korea.

Kim was born in North Hamgyong Province as the eldest son of Kim Il-sung's trusted general Kim Chaek. He attended North Korea's most prestigious schools for cadres, including Mangyongdae Revolutionary School and Kim Il-sung University, and started working in the Workers' Party of Korea from the late 1940s. In 1963, he was appointed general to serve as deputy director of the General Political Bureau of the Korean People's Army to 1968, where he worked to consolidate Kim Il-sung's political control over the army. In 1968 he was made an alternate member of the WPK Central Committee (promoted to full member at the 5th Party Congress in 1970) and director of the Propaganda and Agitation Department, where he worked closely with Kim Jong-il. As the propaganda department fell under the future leader's control, Kim was transferred to director of the Culture Department in 1971 and president of the Kim Il-sung Higher Party School in 1976, but then he apparently fell out of favor and was exiled as ambassador to Ethiopia.

Kim Kuk-thae was called back to North Korea in 1980 to arrange preparations of the 6th Party Congress. He even received the Order of Kim Il-sung in 1982. He was promoted again to a number of leading positions, including director of the Propaganda Department (1983–1984), director of the Education Department (1984–1985), director of the Cadres Department (1985–1990), president of the Higher Party School (1990–1992).

In 1993 Kim was made secretary for party cadre affairs and director of the Cadres Department, with overall responsibility over personnel appointment and management, and was considered to be a close aide of Kim Jong-il. He also served as chairman of the Deputies' Credential Screening Committee of the Supreme People's Assembly for two terms (1998–2003, and 2009–2013), himself being a deputy since 1967. In 2010 he was transferred to chairman of the WPK Central Control Commission and promoted to the top decision-making Politburo. Although he was ranked number 7 in the committee that organized the funeral of Kim Jong-il in December 2011, he kept a low profile under Kim Jong-un, mainly disappearing from public after summer 2012.

Death
He died on 13 December 2013 from heart failure after a five-decade career, and was laid in state in the Central Workers' Hall (home of the General Federation of Trade Unions of Korea) in Pyongyang before being buried in the Patriotic Martyrs' Cemetery.

On his funeral committee were:

 Kim Yong-nam
 Pak Pong-ju
 Choe Ryong-hae
 Ri Yong-gil
 Jang Jong-nam
 Kim Kyong-hui
 Kim Ki-nam
 Choe Thae-bok
 Pak To-chun
 Kim Yong-chun
 Yang Hyong-sop
 Kang Sok-ju
 Ri Yong-mu
 O Kuk-ryol
 Kim Won-hong
 Kim Yang-gon
 Kim Yong-il
 Kim Phyong-hae
 Kwak Pom-gi
 Mun Kyong-dok
 Choe Pu-il
 Kim Chang-sop
 Ro Tu-chol
 Jo Yon-jun
 Thae Jong-su
 Choe Yong-rim
 Hyon Chol-hae
 Ri Pyong-sam
 Ju Kyu-chang
 Ri Yong-su
 Paek Kye-ryong
 Han Kwang-bok
 O Il-jong
 Kim Jong-im
 Kim Chung-hyop
 Han Kwang-sang
 Kim Kyong-ok
 Ri Chae-il
 Choe Hwi
 Kim Man-song
 Chon Il-chun
 Jong Myong-hak
 Kim Hi-thak
 Paek Ryong-chon
 Hong In-bom
 Ri Man-gon
 O Su-yong
 Pak Yong-ho
 Pak Thae-dok
 Kim Chun-sop
 Pak Chong-nam
 Ri Sang-won
 Kang Yang-mo
 Rim Kyong-man

References

1924 births
2013 deaths
Members of the Supreme People's Assembly
Recipients of the Order of Kim Il-sung
Members of the 6th Politburo of the Workers' Party of Korea
Members of the 6th Central Committee of the Workers' Party of Korea